All times given as local time (UTC+2)
Libyan Cup 2008-09
16 sides from the 16 matches being played in this round will go through to the Round of 32, where they will be joined by the 16 Libyan Premier League teams.

Eastern Section
This group will contain 18 sides, 7 of which had qualified from Groups A & B in the First Round. Over the 9 matches, nine will qualify for the Round of 32.

Western Section
This group will contain 14 sides, 6 of which had qualified from Groups C & D in the First Round. Over the 7 ties, 7 teams will go through to the Round of 32.

2